Memory & Desire is a 1998 New Zealand romantic drama film written and directed by Niki Caro, in her feature film directorial debut. The film is based on the 1997 short story, "Of Memory and Desire" by Peter Wells.

Plot
Sayo and Keiji are a Japanese couple who elope to New Zealand to get married. On their honeymoon, frustrated by being unable to consummate their marriage, Keiji fatally drowns in a swimming accident. Heartbroken after losing her husband, Sayo contemplates traveling back to Japan to once again live with her domineering mother, per Japanese tradition. Instead, she stays in New Zealand in the beach where Keiji drowned to find peace.

Cast
 Yuri Kinugawa as Sayo
 Eugene Nomura as Keiji
 Yoko Narahashi as Mrs. Nakajima
 Joel Tobeck as Nod
 Rome Kanda as Tour Guide

Awards and nominations

References

External links

1998 directorial debut films
1998 films
1998 independent films
1998 romantic drama films
1990s English-language films
1990s Japanese-language films
Films about grieving
Films about honeymoon
Films based on short fiction
Films directed by Niki Caro
Films set in New Zealand
Films set on beaches
Films shot in New Zealand
New Zealand independent films
New Zealand romantic drama films
1998 multilingual films
New Zealand multilingual films